Frank La Forge (October 22, 1879 – May 5, 1953) was an American pianist, vocal coach, teacher, composer and arranger of art songs.

Biography
He was born on October 22, 1879 in Rockford, Illinois.

La Forge was a boy soprano.  He first studied piano with his older sister, and went to Vienna in 1900 to study with Theodor Leschetizky.  He recorded prolifically for the Victor Talking Machine Company, as both a soloist and accompanist starting in 1906. As a soloist, he recorded works by Chopin, Liszt and MacDowell. In performance he usually accompanied entirely from memory, considered an unusual feat for an accompanist. In his biography  Pathways of Song, La Forge claimed that he had 'a repertoire of over five thousand memorized accompaniments embracing all schools'. He toured Europe, Russia, and the United States as an accompanist to Marcella Sembrich.  La Forge moved to New York City in 1920, where he became a music teacher, coach, and accompanist. He taught a number of important American singers, including Marian Anderson, Lawrence Tibbett, Marie Powers, Emma Otero and Richard Crooks. He served as accompanist for many vocal stars and instrumentalists of the day including Johanna Gadski, Ernestine Schumann-Heink and Margaret Matzenauer. His longstanding musical relationship with Metropolitan Opera soprano Lily Pons from 1937 until his death, saw the production of recital tours with flutist Frank Versaci, down the eastern seaboard and in British Columbia.

Frank La Forge died at the piano, performing at a Musicians Club of New York dinner in Manhattan on May 5, 1953, for which he had been president since 1935.

Musical works
La Forge composed around 40 songs for voice and piano in the years between 1906 and 1940, as well as a few piano solos, choral works, and at least one solo for violin and piano.  Some of the songs are sacred, and most were published individually by G. Schirmer, while a few have been reissued in various song anthologies and collections of American art songs from the same publisher.  Many of his early songs were composed to German texts and modeled on the German Lied.  Later songs were composed in the more accessible 'concert ballad' style, which was quite popular at the time.  Many were written for specific singers to show off their individual talents.

The songs are known for their craftsmanship, full piano accompaniments, and tasteful musical style.  His 1919 piece Song of the Open was highlighted by Upton as representative of American song from the era 1900-1930.

He was also a highly successful arranger of folksongs; Villamil mentions 'an excellent set of Mexican folk songs'. Perhaps more significant was his work as an important compiler of songs for students, in the collection of several volumes he created with Will Earhart, the Pathways of Song.

Published secular songs

published by G. Schirmer unless noted
 The Butterfly (Der Schmetterling)
 By the Lake
 Camp Meetin' Song (text by La Forge), Carl Fischer, 1952
 Come Unto These Yellow Sands (Shakespeare), 1907
 Contemplation
 The Coyote
 Expectancy (Erwartung)
 Far Away
 Hidden Wounds (Verborgene Wunden)
 Hills (Arthur Guiterman), G. Ricordi, 1925
 How Much I Love You (Wie lieb ich dich hab')
 I Came with a Song (Elizabeth Ruggles), 1914
 I Love But Thee!
 In Evening Stillness (In der Abendstille)
 In Pride of May
 Like the Rosebud (Avec une ruse), 1906
 The Lovely Rose
 May's Coming (Frühlingseinzug)
 My Love and I
 Pastorale (John Milton), Galaxy Music, 1932
 Reawakening (Widererwachen)
 Retreat (Schlupfwinkel) (Princess Gabriele Wrede; English translation), 1906
 Serenade
 Song of the Open (Jessica H. Lowell), Ditson, 1919
 Spooks (Spuk)
 Take, O Take Those Lips Away (Shakespeare)
 To a Messenger (An einem Boten) (Princess Gabriele Wrede; English translation), 1909
 To a Violet
 To One Afar
 Vale Carissima
 Voodoo Spirits (Della Hayward), Carl Fischer, 1946
 When Your Dear Hands
 Wherefore? (Wozu?)

Published sacred songs
published by G. Schirmer unless noted
 And there were shepherds abiding in the fields, Carl Fischer, 1938
 Before the Crucifix (Dinanzi al crocifisso) (Princess Gabriele Wrede; English version by Robert Huntington; Italian version by Paolo Rusca), 1912
 Bless the Lord (Psalm 103), Carl Fischer, 1933
 But the Hour Cometh
 Hast Thou Not Known
 Have Mercy Upon Me O God, Sacred Song For Voice and Piano, 1942  
 Make a Joyful Noise, Carl Fischer, 1938
 O Sing Unto the Lord
 The Shephard
 Supplication (Minnie K. Breid), Flammer, 1918
 Teach Me, O Lord, Carl Fischer, 1938
 They that trust in the Lord, Galaxy, 1942

Published choral works
 First Psalm, SATB or TTBB a cappella

Published piano solos
 Etude for sostenuto pedal, for piano, Carl Fischer publisher, 1943
 Gavotte
 Gavotte and Musette
 Improvisation
 Romance, 1911
 Souvenir de Vienne
 Valse de Concert, 1912[9][9][9]

Published instrumental solos
 Romance, violin and piano

Arrangements and editing
 Echo Song by Henry Bishop, transcribed for voice, flute and piano by La Forge, Schirmer, 1940
 Fledermaus Fantasy, excerpts from Die Fledermaus by Johann Strauss II, transcribed for voice, flute and piano by La Forge, Schirmer, 1943
 Little swallow (O légère hirondelle), waltz song from Mireille by Charles Gounod, transcribed for voice, flute and piano by La Forge, Schirmer, 1942
 Love-Tide of Spring (La primavera d'or) by Alexander Glazunov, transcription for voice and piano, Schirmer, 1913
 Menuet Varié (Minuet with variations), anonymous 18th-century French work, transcribed for voice, flute and piano by La Forge, Schirmer, 1940
 Mexican Songs for voice and piano, arranged and translated by La Forge, G. Ricordi publisher:
1. Pregúntales á las Estrellas (O ask of the stars, beloved), Mexican folk-song, 1922
2. Crepuscúlo (Twilight), Mexican folk-song, 1922
3. El Céfiro (The Zephyr), Mexican folk-song, 1922
4. La Paloma (The Dove) by Sebastián Yradier, 1922
5. La Golondrina (The Swallow), Mexican folk-song, 1922
6. En Cuba (Cuban Song) by Eduardo Sánchez de Fuentes, 1923
7. Estrellita (Little Star) by Manuel Ponce, 1923
8. Yo paso la Vida (In Sorrow and Sighing) by Jose Islas, 1926
 On the beautiful blue Danube by Johann Strauss II, transcribed for voice and piano by La Forge, G. Ricordi, 1928
 Pathways of Song, compiled, arranged, translated and edited by Frank LaForge and Will Earhart, M. Witmark publisher, 1938
 Tales from the Vienna Forest by Johann Strauss II, piano solo transcribed for voice and piano by La Forge, Schirmer, 1912

Footnotes

References

External links
http://www.lieder.net/lieder/l/laforge.html Texts of some songs by Frank La Forge
https://www.youtube.com/watch?v=r9T1DUOwV-g Lily Pons performs a Frank La Forge Song
Sheet music for "Valse de Concert", G. Schirmer, Inc., 1912.
 Frank La Forge recordings at the Discography of American Historical Recordings.

1879 births
1953 deaths
20th-century American composers
20th-century classical composers
20th-century American male musicians
American classical composers
American male classical composers
Classical musicians from Illinois
Musicians from Rockford, Illinois
Writers from Rockford, Illinois